The 2012 Calder Cup playoffs of the American Hockey League began on April 19, 2012, with a slightly different playoff format than in other recent years. The sixteen teams that qualified, eight from each conference, will play a best-of-five series in the conference quarterfinals, and the playoffs will then continue with best-of-seven series for the conference semifinals, conference finals and Calder Cup finals.

The Norfolk Admirals defeated the Toronto Marlies in four games to win the Calder Cup for the first time in Norfolk's history.

Playoff seeds
After the 2011–12 AHL regular season, 16 teams qualified for the playoffs. The top eight teams from each conference qualifies for the playoffs.

Eastern Conference

Atlantic Division
St. John's IceCaps – 94 points
Manchester Monarchs – 83 points

Northeast Division
Bridgeport Sound Tigers – 91 points
Connecticut Whale – 86 points

East Division
Norfolk Admirals – 113 points
Wilkes-Barre/Scranton Penguins – 95 points
Hershey Bears – 88 points
Syracuse Crunch – 84 points

Western Conference

North Division
Toronto Marlies – 96 points
Rochester Americans – 86 points (30 regulation and overtime wins, 1−1 in season series against Houston, +3 goal difference)

Midwest Division
Chicago Wolves – 91 points
Milwaukee Admirals – 87 points (36 regulation and overtime wins, 3−1 in season series against San Antonio)

West Division
Oklahoma City Barons – 99 points
Abbotsford Heat – 92 points
San Antonio Rampage – 87 points (36 regulation and overtime wins, 1−3 in season series against Milwaukee)
Houston Aeros – 86 points (30 regulation and overtime wins, 1−1 in season series against Rochester, −4 goal difference)

Bracket

Conference quarterfinals 
Note 1: All times are in Eastern Time (UTC−4).
Note 2: Game times in italics signify games to be played only if necessary.
Note 3: Home team is listed first.

Eastern Conference

(1) Norfolk Admirals vs. (8) Manchester Monarchs

(2) St. John's IceCaps vs. (7) Syracuse Crunch

(3) Bridgeport Sound Tigers vs. (6) Connecticut Whale

(4) Wilkes-Barre/Scranton Penguins vs. (5) Hershey Bears

Western Conference

(1) Oklahoma City Barons vs. (8) Houston Aeros

(2) Toronto Marlies vs. (7) Rochester Americans

(3) Chicago Wolves vs. (6) San Antonio Rampage

(4) Abbotsford Heat vs. (5) Milwaukee Admirals

Conference semifinals

Eastern Conference

(1) Norfolk Admirals vs. (6) Connecticut Whale 

* Game five was played at the Webster Bank Arena in Bridgeport.

(2) St. John's IceCaps vs. (4) Wilkes-Barre/Scranton Penguins

Western Conference

(1) Oklahoma City Barons vs. (6) San Antonio Rampage

(2) Toronto Marlies vs. (4) Abbotsford Heat

Conference finals

Eastern Conference

(1) Norfolk Admirals vs. (2) St. John's IceCaps

Western Conference

(1) Oklahoma City Barons vs. (2) Toronto Marlies

Calder Cup Finals

Norfolk Admirals vs. Toronto Marlies

Playoff statistical leaders

Leading skaters 

These are the top ten skaters based on points. If there is a tie in points, goals take precedence over assists.

GP = Games played; G = Goals; A = Assists; Pts = Points; +/– = Plus-minus; PIM = Penalty minutes

Leading goaltenders 

This is a combined table of the top five goaltenders based on goals against average and the top five goaltenders based on save percentage with at least 360 minutes played. The table is initially sorted by goals against average, with the criterion for inclusion in bold.

GP = Games played; W = Wins; L = Losses; SA = Shots against; GA = Goals against; GAA = Goals against average; SV% = Save percentage; SO = Shutouts; TOI = Time on ice (in minutes)

Broadcasting 
Leafs TV, as the main broadcaster of the Toronto Marlies, aired the first three games of the Calder Cup Final in Canada. While the channel is normally restricted to the home market of the Toronto Maple Leafs (which includes most of Ontario), Leafs TV allowed television providers outside of the Leafs' market to carry the channel during the Calder Cup on a "preview" basis to allow nationwide coverage of the games. Sportsnet One would replace Leafs TV to air Game 4. In the United States, CBS Sports Network picked up the broadcast rights in the United States beginning with game 3, while Norfolk-area CW affiliate WGNT aired the games in simulcast with their Canadian broadcaster. The series was also carried by ESPN America, and on the NHL Home Ice channel on Sirius XM.

See also
2011–12 AHL season
List of AHL seasons

References

Calder Cup playoffs
Calder Cup